Derek Charles Ernest Harrison (born 1 May 1959) is a British former motorcycle speedway rider.

Born in Brandon, Suffolk, Harrison began his career in 1976 with Boston Barracudas. Between 1978 and 1980 he rode for both his parent club King's Lynn Stars in the British League and between 1978 and 1979 rode in the National League (NL) with Milton Keynes Knights. In 1980 he transferred to Cradley Heathens and also rode in the National League for Oxford Cheetahs in 1980 and 1981. In 1982 and 1983 he rode for Mildenhall Fen Tigers in the NL as well as spells with Leicester Lions,  Reading Racers, and Birmingham Brummies in the top flight. In 1984 he transferred to Peterborough Panthers before spending his final season with Eastbourne Eagles.

Harrison represented England at National League level in two matches against Scotland in 1979.

References

1959 births
Living people
British speedway riders
Boston Barracudas riders
Milton Keynes Knights riders
King's Lynn Stars riders
English motorcycle racers
Leicester Lions riders
Peterborough Panthers riders
Eastbourne Eagles riders
Oxford Cheetahs riders
Cradley Heathens riders
Mildenhall Fen Tigers riders
Reading Racers riders
Birmingham Brummies riders
People from Brandon, Suffolk